The following lists events that happened during 1895 in Chile.

Incumbents
President of Chile: Jorge Montt

Events

July
4 July - The Chilean cruiser Esmeralda (1895) is laid down.

Births
27 March - Juan Guzmán Cruchaga (died 1979)
10 May - Cristina Montt (died 1969)

References 

 
Years of the 19th century in Chile
Chile